The 2020–21 New York Knicks season was the 75th season of the franchise in the National Basketball Association (NBA). On July 30, 2020, the Knicks hired Tom Thibodeau as their new head coach.

Fan attendance in home games was prohibited until February 23, 2021, per an executive order from then-Governor of New York Andrew Cuomo. The Knicks reopened Madison Square Garden to spectators on February 23.

On May 3, with a 118–104 win over the Memphis Grizzlies, the Knicks clinched their first winning season since the 2012–13 season. On May 12, the Knicks clinched their first playoff appearance since 2013, ending their eight-year playoff drought.

The Knicks faced the Atlanta Hawks in the First Round of the 2021 NBA playoffs, losing in five games.

After the regular season, Julius Randle was named NBA Most Improved Player, while head coach Tom Thibodeau was named the NBA Coach of the Year, becoming the first Knicks head coach since Pat Riley in 1992–93 to receive the award.

Draft

The Knicks entered the draft holding two first round picks and one second round pick. The first round pick (no. 27) was acquired on February 6, 2020, in a trade with the Los Angeles Clippers. The second round pick was acquired on February 7, 2018, in a trade with the Charlotte Hornets. Before the draft the Knicks traded their 27th and 38th overall picks to the Utah Jazz in exchange for draft rights to Ante Tomić and 23rd overall pick. The Knicks used their eighth overall pick to select Obi Toppin, and then selected Leandro Bolmaro with the 23rd overall pick, who was then traded to the Minnesota Timberwolves.

Roster

Standings

Division

Conference

Game log

Preseason
The preseason schedule was announced on November 27, 2020.

|- style="background:#bfb;"
| 1
| December 11
| @ Detroit
| 
| Barrett (15)
| Noel, Randle (8)
| Payton (7)
| Little Caesars ArenaNo in-person attendance
| 1–0
|- style="background:#fbb;"
| 2
| December 13
| @ Detroit
| 
| Barrett (25)
| Noel (10)
| Randle (5)
| Little Caesars ArenaNo in-person attendance
| 1–1
|- style="background:#bfb;"
| 3
| December 16
| Cleveland
| 
| Randle (18)
| Robinson (10)
| Payton, Quickley (7)
| Madison Square GardenNo in-person attendance
| 2–1
|- style="background:#bfb;"
| 4
| December 18
| Cleveland
| 
| Quickley (22)
| Robinson (12)
| Randle (8)
| Madison Square GardenNo in-person attendance
| 3–1

Regular season
The schedule for the first half of the season was released on December 4, 2020, while the schedule for the second half was released on February 24, 2021.

|- style="background:#fbb;"
| 1
| December 23
| @ Indiana
| 
| Barrett (26)
| Randle (9)
| Randle (9)
| Bankers Life FieldhouseNo in-person attendance
| 0–1
|- style="background:#fbb;"
| 2
| December 26
| Philadelphia
| 
| Randle (25)
| Robinson (9)
| Barrett (4)
| Madison Square GardenNo in-person attendance
| 0–2
|- style="background:#bfb;"
| 3
| December 27
| Milwaukee
| 
| Randle (29)
| Randle (14)
| Payton, Randle (7)
| Madison Square GardenNo in-person attendance
| 1–2
|- style="background:#bfb;"
| 4
| December 29
| @ Cleveland
| 
| Randle (28)
| Randle (12)
| Randle (11)
| Rocket Mortgage FieldHouse300
| 2–2
|- style="background:#fbb;"
| 5
| December 31
| @ Toronto
| 
| Knox, Randle (16)
| Randle (10)
| Randle, Rivers (5)
| Amalie Arena3,449
| 2–3

|- style="background:#bfb;"
| 6
| January 2
| @ Indiana
| 
| Barrett (25)
| Randle (11)
| Randle (8)
| Bankers Life FieldhouseNo in-person attendance
| 3–3
|- style="background:#bfb;"
| 7
| January 4
| @ Atlanta
| 
| Randle (28)
| Randle (17)
| Randle (9)
| State Farm ArenaNo in-person attendance
| 4–3
|- style="background:#bfb;"
| 8
| January 6
| Utah
| 
| Randle (30)
| Randle (16)
| Payton (8)
| Madison Square GardenNo in-person attendance
| 5–3
|- style="background:#fbb;"
| 9
| January 8
| Oklahoma City
| 
| Barrett (19)
| Randle (12)
| Randle (7)
| Madison Square GardenNo in-person attendance
| 5–4
|- style="background:#fbb;"
| 10
| January 10
| Denver
| 
| Randle (29)
| Randle (10)
| Payton, Randle (5)
| Madison Square GardenNo in-person attendance
| 5–5
|- style="background:#fbb;"
| 11
| January 11
| @ Charlotte
| 
| Knox (19)
| Robinson (11)
| Barrett, Randle (5)
| Spectrum CenterNo in-person attendance
| 5–6
|- style="background:#fbb;"
| 12
| January 13
| Brooklyn
| 
| Randle (30)
| Robinson (12)
| Randle (5)
| Madison Square GardenNo in-person attendance
| 5–7
|- style="background:#fbb;"
| 13
| January 15
| @ Cleveland
| 
| Randle (28)
| Randle, Robinson (6)
| Randle (6)
| Rocket Mortgage FieldHouse1,944
| 5–8
|- style="background:#bfb;"
| 14
| January 17
| @ Boston
| 
| Randle (20)
| Randle (12)
| Quickley (8)
| TD GardenNo in-person attendance
| 6–8
|- style="background:#bfb;"
| 15
| January 18
| Orlando
| 
| Barrett (22)
| Randle (17)
| Barrett, Payton (4)
| Madison Square GardenNo in-person attendance
| 7–8
|- style="background:#bfb;"
| 16
| January 21
| @ Golden State
| 
| Barrett (28)
| Randle (17)
| Randle (9)
| Chase CenterNo in-person attendance
| 8–8
|- style="background:#fbb;"
| 17
| January 22
| @ Sacramento
| 
| Randle (26)
| Randle (15)
| Randle (4)
| Golden 1 CenterNo in-person attendance
| 8–9
|- style="background:#fbb;"
| 18
| January 24
| @ Portland
| 
| Quickley (31)
| Noel (11)
| Randle (5)
| Moda CenterNo in-person attendance
| 8–10
|- style="background:#fbb;"
| 19
| January 26
| @ Utah
| 
| Rivers (25)
| Randle (10)
| Barrett, Randle (4)
| Vivint Arena1,932
| 8–11
|- style="background:#bfb;"
| 20
| January 29
| Cleveland
| 
| Quickley (25)
| Randle (8)
| Randle (6)
| Madison Square GardenNo in-person attendance
| 9–11
|- style="background:#fbb;"
| 21
| January 31
| L.A. Clippers
| 
| Randle (27)
| Randle (12)
| Randle (5)
| Madison Square GardenNo in-person attendance
| 9–12

|- style="background:#fbb;"
| 22
| February 1
| @ Chicago
| 
| Randle (23)
| Randle (11)
| Quickley, Randle (7)
| United CenterNo in-person attendance
| 9–13
|- style="background:#bfb;"
| 23
| February 3
| @ Chicago
| 
| Randle (27)
| Robinson (11)
| Randle (6)
| United CenterNo in-person attendance
| 10–13
|- style="background:#bfb;"
| 24
| February 6
| Portland
| 
| Payton, Randle (22)
| Randle (11)
| Payton, Randle (4)
| Madison Square GardenNo in-person attendance
| 11–13
|- style="background:#fbb;"
| 25
| February 7
| Miami
| 
| Randle (26)
| Randle (13)
| Randle (7)
| Madison Square GardenNo in-person attendance
| 11–14
|- style="background:#fbb;"
| 26
| February 9
| @ Miami
| 
| Payton (18)
| Randle (8)
| Payton (4)
| American Airlines ArenaNo in-person attendance
| 11–15
|- style="background:#bfb;"
| 27
| February 12
| @ Washington
| 
| Randle (24)
| Randle (18)
| Rose (6)
| Capital One ArenaNo in-person attendance
| 12–15
|- style="background:#bfb;"
| 28
| February 13
| Houston
| 
| Quickley, Randle (22)
| Randle (9)
| Barrett (5)
| Madison Square GardenNo in-person attendance
| 13–15
|- style="background:#bfb;"
| 29
| February 15
| Atlanta
| 
| Randle (44)
| Randle (9)
| Quickley, Randle (5)
| Madison Square GardenNo in-person attendance
| 14–15
|- style="background:#fbb;"
| 30
| February 17
| @ Orlando
| 
| Randle (25)
| Noel (9)
| Payton (5)
| Amway Center4,249
| 14–16
|- style="background:#bbb;"
| —
| February 20
| San Antonio
| —
| colspan="3"|Postponed due to COVID-19 pandemic; moved to May 13
| Madison Square Garden
| —
|- style="background:#bfb;"
| 31
| February 21
| Minnesota
| 
| Randle (25)
| Randle (14)
| Payton (7)
| Madison Square GardenNo in-person attendance
| 15–16
|- style="background:#fbb;"
| 32
| February 23
| Golden State
| 
| Randle (25)
| Gibson (11)
| Rose (8)
| Madison Square Garden1,981
| 15–17
|- style="background:#bfb;"
| 33
| February 25
| Sacramento
| 
| Quickley (25)
| Randle (14)
| Rose (6)
| Madison Square Garden1,981
| 16–17
|- style="background:#bfb;"
| 34
| February 27
| Indiana
| 
| Randle (28)
| Randle (10)
| Rose (11)
| Madison Square Garden1,981
| 17–17
|- style="background:#bfb;"
| 35
| February 28
| @ Detroit
| 
| Randle (25)
| Noel (11)
| Randle (6)
| Little Caesars ArenaNo in-person attendance
| 18–17

|- style="background:#fbb;"
| 36
| March 2
| @ San Antonio
| 
| Quickley (26)
| Noel (12)
| Randle (5)
| AT&T CenterNo in-person attendance
| 18–18
|- style="background:#bfb;"
| 37
| March 4
| Detroit
| 
| Randle (27)
| Randle (16)
| Randle (7)
| Madison Square Garden1,981
| 19–18
|- style="background:#fbb;"
| 38
| March 11
| @ Milwaukee
| 
| Barrett (22)
| Randle (8)
| Burks (8)
| Fiserv Forum1,800
| 19–19
|- style="background:#bfb;"
| 39
| March 13
| @ Oklahoma City
| 
| Barrett (32)
| Randle (12)
| Randle (12)
| Chesapeake Energy ArenaNo in-person attendance
| 20–19
|- style="background:#fbb;"
| 40
| March 15
| @ Brooklyn
| 
| Randle (33)
| Randle (12)
| Randle (6)
| Barclays Center1,637
| 20–20
|- style="background:#fbb;"
| 41
| March 16
| @ Philadelphia
| 
| Burks, Randle (19)
| Randle (15)
| Randle (8)
| Wells Fargo Center3,071
| 20–21
|- style="background:#bfb;"
| 42
| March 18
| Orlando
| 
| Burks (21)
| Burks, Randle (10)
| Randle (17)
| Madison Square Garden1,531
| 21–21
|- style="background:#fbb;"
| 43
| March 21
| Philadelphia
| 
| Randle (24)
| Noel (10)
| Barrett, Burks (4)
| Madison Square Garden1,981
| 21–22
|- style="background:#bfb;"
| 44
| March 23
| Washington
| 
| Randle (37)
| Robinson (12)
| Barrett (5)
| Madison Square Garden1,589
| 22–22
|- style="background:#bfb;"
| 45
| March 25
| Washington
| 
| Burks (27)
| Barrett (10)
| Barrett (5)
| Madison Square Garden1,817
| 23–22
|- style="background:#bfb;"
| 46
| March 27
| @ Milwaukee
| 
| Barrett, Burks (21)
| Noel (11)
| Barrett (7)
| Fiserv Forum3,280
| 24–22
|- style="background:#fbb;"
| 47
| March 29
| Miami
| 
| Randle (22)
| Noel (11)
| Barrett (4)
| Madison Square Garden1,981
| 24–23
|- style="background:#fbb;"
| 48
| March 31
| @ Minnesota
| 
| Randle (26)
| Randle (12)
| Randle (6)
| Target CenterNo in-person attendance
| 24–24

|- style="background:#fbb;"
| 49
| April 2
| Dallas
| 
| Burks (20)
| Randle (8)
| Randle (11)
| Madison Square Garden1,981
| 24–25
|- style="background:#bfb;"
| 50
| April 3
| @ Detroit
| 
| Randle (29)
| Randle (8)
| Payton (9)
| Little Caesars Arena750
| 25–25
|- style="background:#fbb;"
| 51
| April 5
| @ Brooklyn
| 
| Barrett (22)
| Randle (15)
| Randle (12)
| Barclays Center1,773
| 25–26
|- style="background:#fbb;"
| 52
| April 7
| @ Boston
| 
| Barrett (29)
| Randle (9)
| Randle (6)
| TD Garden2,298
| 25–27
|- style="background:#bfb;"
| 53
| April 9
| Memphis
| 
| Barrett, Quickley (20)
| Randle (10)
| Randle (11)
| Madison Square Garden1,912
| 26–27
|- style="background:#bfb;"
| 54
| April 11
| Toronto
| 
| Randle (26)
| Noel (13)
| Barrett, Randle (5)
| Madison Square Garden1,833
| 27–27
|- style="background:#bfb;"
| 55
| April 12
| L.A. Lakers
| 
| Randle (34)
| Gibson, Randle (10)
| Randle (4)
| Madison Square Garden1,981
| 28–27
|- style="background:#bfb;"
| 56
| April 14
| @ New Orleans
| 
| Randle (32)
| Gibson (10)
| Randle (5)
| Smoothie King Center3,700
| 29–27
|- style="background:#bfb;"
| 57
| April 16
| @ Dallas
| 
| Randle (44)
| Noel, Randle (10)
| Randle (7)
| American Airlines Center4,246
| 30–27
|- style="background:#bfb;"
| 58
| April 18
| New Orleans
| 
| Randle (33)
| Gibson (14)
| Randle (10)
| Madison Square Garden1,981
| 31–27
|- style="background:#bfb;"
| 59
| April 20
| Charlotte
| 
| Barrett (24)
| Noel (11)
| Randle (7)
| Madison Square Garden1,753
| 32–27
|- style="background:#bfb;"
| 60
| April 21
| Atlanta
| 
| Randle (40)
| Noel (12)
| Randle (6)
| Madison Square Garden1,981
| 33–27
|- style="background:#bfb;"
| 61
| April 24
| Toronto
| 
| Randle (31)
| Barrett (12)
| Rose (7)
| Madison Square Garden1,981
| 34–27
|- style="background:#fbb;"
| 62
| April 26
| Phoenix
| 
| Rose (22)
| Randle, Rose (6)
| Rose (6)
| Madison Square Garden1,981
| 34–28
|- style="background:#bfb;"
| 63
| April 28
| Chicago
| 
| Randle (34)
| Noel (8)
| Barrett, Rose (6)
| Madison Square Garden1,981
| 35–28

|- style="background:#bfb;"
| 64
| May 2
| @ Houston
| 
| Randle (31)
| Barrett, Randle (7)
| Randle (6)
| Toyota Center3,431
| 36–28
|- style="background:#bfb;"
| 65
| May 3
| @ Memphis
| 
| Randle (28)
| Gibson (12)
| Randle (6)
| FedExForum2,789
| 37–28
|- style="background:#fbb;"
| 66
| May 5
| @ Denver
| 
| Quickley (18)
| Randle (8)
| Randle (5)
| Ball Arena4,038
| 37–29
|- style="background:#fbb;"
| 67
| May 7
| @ Phoenix
| 
| Randle (24)
| Randle (11)
| Rose (6)
| PHX Arena8,063
| 37–30
|- style="background:#bfb;"
| 68
| May 9
| @ L.A. Clippers
| 
| Rose (25)
| Randle (14)
| Rose (8)
| Staples Center2,578
| 38–30
|- style="background:#fbb;"
| 69
| May 11
| @ L.A. Lakers
| 
| Randle (31)
| Randle (8)
| Rose (6)
| Staples Center3,550
| 38–31
|- style="background:#bfb;"
| 70
| May 13
| San Antonio
| 
| Burks (30)
| Burks (10)
| Randle (9)
| Madison Square Garden1,981
| 39–31
|- style="background:#bfb;"
| 71
| May 15
| Charlotte
| 
| Randle (33)
| Noel (11)
| Randle (13)
| Madison Square Garden1,981
| 40–31
|- style="background:#bfb;"
| 72
| May 16
| Boston
| 
| Barrett (22)
| Randle (7)
| Randle (7)
| Madison Square Garden1,981
| 41–31

Playoffs

|- style="background:#fbb;"
| 1
| May 23
| Atlanta
| 
| Burks (27)
| Randle (12)
| Rose (5)
| Madison Square Garden15,047
| 0–1
|- style="background:#bfb;"
| 2
| May 26
| Atlanta
| 
| Rose (26)
| Randle (12)
| Randle, Rose (4)
| Madison Square Garden16,254
| 1–1
|- style="background:#fbb;"
| 3
| May 28
| @ Atlanta
| 
| Rose (30)
| Randle (11)
| Rose (5)
| State Farm Arena15,743
| 1–2
|- style="background:#fbb;"
| 4
| May 30
| @ Atlanta
| 
| Randle (23)
| Randle (10)
| Randle (7)
| State Farm Arena16,458
| 1–3
|- style="background:#fbb;"
| 5
| June 2
| Atlanta
| 
| Randle (23)
| Randle (13)
| Barrett, Rose (5)
| Madison Square Garden16,512
| 1–4

Player statistics

Regular season statistics
As of May 16, 2021

|-
| style="text-align:left;"| || 72 || 72 || 34.9 || .441 || .401 || .746 || 5.8 || 3.0 || .7 || .3 || 17.6
|-
| style="text-align:left;"| || 4 || 0 || 1.8 || .000 ||  || 1.000 || .5 || .3 || .0 || .0 || .5
|-
| style="text-align:left;"| || 65 || 64 || 30.0 || .442 || .410 || .909 || 3.4 || 1.5 || .8 || .2 || 10.9
|-
| style="text-align:left;"| || 49 || 5 || 25.6 || .420 || .415 || .856 || 4.6 || 2.2 || .6 || .3 || 12.7
|-
| style="text-align:left;"| || 45 || 3 || 20.8 || .627 || .200 || .727 || 5.6 || .8 || .7 || 1.1 || 5.4
|-
| style="text-align:left;"| || 8 || 0 || 2.0 || .000 || .000 || .750 || .3 || .1 || .0 || .0 || .4
|-
| style="text-align:left;"| || 42 || 0 || 11.0 || .392 || .393 || .800 || 1.5 || .5 || .3 || .1 || 3.9
|-
| style="text-align:left;"| || 64 || 41 || 24.2 || .614 || .000 || .714 || 6.4 || .7 || 1.1 || 2.2 || 5.1
|-
| style="text-align:left;"| || 33 || 4 || 9.8 || .367 || .479 || .444 || .9 || .6 || .5 || .1 || 2.7
|-
| style="text-align:left;"| || 63 || 63 || 23.6 || .432 || .286 || .682 || 3.4 || 3.2 || .7 || .1 || 10.1
|-
| style="text-align:left;"| || 9 || 0 || 5.8 || .714 ||  || .500 || 1.2 || .1 || .1 || .7 || 1.2
|-
| style="text-align:left;"| || 17 || 0 || 2.0 || .111 || .000 ||  || .3 || .1 || .0 || .0 || .1
|-
| style="text-align:left;"| || 64 || 3 || 19.4 || .395 || .389 || .891 || 2.1 || 2.0 || .5 || .2 || 11.4
|-
| style="text-align:left;"| || 71 || 71 || 37.6 || .456 || .411 || .811 || 10.2 || 6.0 || .9 || .3 || 24.1
|-
| style="text-align:left;"| || 21 || 2 || 21.0 || .430 || .364 || .714 || 2.2 || 2.0 || .6 || .0 || 7.3
|-
| style="text-align:left;"| || 31 || 29 || 27.5 || .653 ||  || .491 || 8.1 || .5 || 1.1 || 1.5 || 8.3
|-
| style="text-align:left;"| || 35 || 3 || 26.8 || .487 || .411 || .883 || 2.9 || 4.2 || .9 || .4 || 14.9
|-
| style="text-align:left;"| || 3 || 0 || 9.3 || .200 || .000 || .833 || .7 || 1.0 || 1.0 || .0 || 3.0
|-
| style="text-align:left;"| || 62 || 0 || 11.0 || .498 || .306 || .731 || 2.2 || .5 || .3 || .2 || 4.1

Playoff statistics
As of June 2, 2021

|-
| style="text-align:left;"| || 5 || 5 || 32.4 || .388 || .286 || .800 || 7.2 || 3.0 || .8 || .4 || 14.4
|-
| style="text-align:left;"| || 5 || 5 || 32.4 || .385 || .345 || .800 || 3.4 || 1.2 || .6 || .2 || 8.8
|-
| style="text-align:left;"| || 5 || 0 || 25.6 || .429 || .333 || .737 || 5.0 || 2.6 || .2 || .0 || 14.0
|-
| style="text-align:left;"| || 5 || 3 || 27.6 || .600 ||  || 1.000 || 7.0 || .8 || 1.6 || 1.0 || 5.0
|-
| style="text-align:left;"| || 1 || 0 || 4.0 ||  ||  || 1.000 || 1.0 || 1.0 || .0 || 1.0 || 2.0
|-
| style="text-align:left;"| || 5 || 2 || 18.4 || .500 ||  || .813 || 4.0 || .2 || .8 || .6 || 4.6
|-
| style="text-align:left;"| || 3 || 0 || 1.3 || .000 || .000 ||  || .0 || .0 || .0 || .0 || .0
|-
| style="text-align:left;"| || 2 || 2 || 6.5 || .000 ||  || .500 || .0 || .5 || .5 || .0 || .5
|-
| style="text-align:left;"| || 5 || 0 || 15.4 || .303 || .364 || .714 || 1.4 || 1.0 || .6 || .0 || 5.8
|-
| style="text-align:left;"| || 5 || 5 || 36.0 || .298 || .333 || .852 || 11.6 || 4.0 || .6 || .0 || 18.0
|-
| style="text-align:left;"| || 5 || 3 || 35.0 || .476 || .471 || 1.000 || 4.0 || 5.0 || .4 || .2 || 19.4
|-
| style="text-align:left;"| || 5 || 0 || 13.0 || .522 || .333 || .833 || 2.6 || .4 || .0 || .2 || 6.4

Transactions

Trades

Additions

Subtractions

References

External links
 2020–21 New York Knicks at Basketball-Reference.com

New York Knicks seasons
New York Knicks
New York Knicks
New York Knicks
2020s in Manhattan
Madison Square Garden